Salvador Farfán Vigueras (born 22 June 1932) is a Mexican former football midfielder who played for Mexico in the 1962 FIFA World Cup. He also played for Atlante.

References

External links
FIFA profile

1932 births
Living people
Association football midfielders
Mexican footballers
Mexico international footballers
1962 FIFA World Cup players
Liga MX players
Club América footballers
Atlante F.C. footballers